A referendum on the law on unemployment insurance was held in Liechtenstein on 22 November 1931. The proposal was rejected by 63.8% of voters.

Results

References

1931 referendums
1931 in Liechtenstein
Referendums in Liechtenstein
November 1931 events